Hüseyin Erçetin (4 October 1911 – 25 April 1993) was a Turkish wrestler. He competed in the men's freestyle welterweight at the 1936 Summer Olympics.

References

External links
 

1911 births
1993 deaths
Turkish male sport wrestlers
Olympic wrestlers of Turkey
Wrestlers at the 1936 Summer Olympics
People from Beypazarı